Annickia polycarpa is a small to medium-sized tree found in evergreen forests of West and Central Africa, it is within the Annonaceae family. It is also called the African Yellow wood.

Description 
Annickia polycarpa is a small to medium-sized tree capable of reaching 20 meters tall and 40 cm in diameter. Bark is usually smooth and occasionally, somewhat rough, fairly thick, with fibrous inner bark, black to greenish in color. Petiole is sparsely pubescent, 3–8 mm long; leaf-blade is oblong, elliptical or obovate in outline with a papery surface, 5–27 cm long and 4–8 cm wide, acuminate at the apex and rounded at the base, covered with stellate hairs below. Solitary flowers on young shoots, pedicel is 0.9-1.9 cm long; sepal: three, triangular shaped, pubescent on the outside, inside is slightly pubescent, petals: yellow when fresh, elliptic in outline, up to 3 cm long. Flowering season is between July and August.

Distribution 
Commonly occurs in the forest regions of West and Central Africa, from Sierra Leone to Cameroon; in Ivory Coast, it grows as an understorey in dense forests.

Chemistry 
Bark extracts shows presence of  quinolic and isoquinolic class of alkaloids; compounds extracted from leaves and bark of the species have been reported to contain corydaldine, aporphinoids, berberines and protoberberine groups of alkaloids, .

Uses 
Bark extracts are used by herbalists in traditional treatment of malaria related symptoms, ulcers and leprous spots. Stem bark is used for constructing huts, and a yellow dye obtained from the species is used for dyeing cloths, mats and leather.

References

Annonaceae
Flora of West Tropical Africa
Flora of Ivory Coast